Peachtree Summit is a , 31-story skyscraper in downtown Atlanta, Georgia. Completed in 1975, Peachtree Summit is shaped like a triangle due to the unusual shape of its building lot, which is hemmed in by the Downtown Connector, West Peachtree Street, and Ivan Allen Jr. Boulevard. The building has a direct connection to the Civic Center MARTA station and was built with a three-story lobby to account for the late 1970s elevation of West Peachtree Street for MARTA construction. This building was planned as the first of three similar buildings for the area, of which only this one was constructed.

See also
List of tallest buildings in Atlanta

References

Skyscraper office buildings in Atlanta
Government buildings in Georgia (U.S. state)
Office buildings completed in 1975